The Gardens of Light is a 1991 novel by the French-Lebanese writer Amin Maalouf. It focuses on the Parthian religious thinker Mani, founder of Manichaeism.

Reception
David Guy wrote in The New York Times, "The Gardens of Light has the feel of a 1950's Hollywood epic, in which men gesture boldly and deliver words that deserve to be immediately carved in stone. ... Maalouf's epic style and wooden characters, as rendered here in Dorothy S. Blair's functional translation from the French, are burdensome. We follow Mani's actions, but we long for an imaginative journey into his inner life, some insight into how his liberal convictions were formed at a time when so much religious belief was marked by extreme factionalism and rigidity."

Kirkus Reviews described the book as a "fine meditative historical novel", "obviously scrupulously researched", "intermittently discursive"", and "suffused with a (nicely translated) dramatic lyricism".

See also
 1991 in literature
 Contemporary French literature

References

1991 novels
Novels by Amin Maalouf